The 2019–20 Boston College Eagles women's basketball team represented Boston College during the 2019–20 NCAA Division I women's basketball season. The Eagles were led by second year head coach Joanna Bernabei-McNamee. They played their home games at the Conte Forum and were members of the Atlantic Coast Conference.

The Eagles finished the season 20–12 and 11–7 in ACC play to finish in a tie for fourth place.  As the sixth seed in the ACC tournament, they defeated Clemson in the Second Round and Duke in the Quarterfinals before losing to eventual champion NC State in Semifinals.  The NCAA tournament and WNIT were cancelled due to the COVID-19 outbreak.

Previous season
They finished the season 14–16, 3–13 in ACC play to finish in thirteenth place. They lost in the first round of the ACC women's tournament to Virginia.  The Eagles were not invited to any post-season tournaments.

Off-season

Recruiting Class

Source:

Roster

Schedule

Source:

|-
!colspan=9 style=| Regular season

|-
!colspan=9 style=| ACC Women's Tournament

Rankings

Coaches did not release a Week 2 poll and AP does not release a final poll.  Due to the cancellation of the NCAA Tournament, the coaches poll did not release a final ranking.

See also
 2019–20 Boston College Eagles men's basketball team

References

Boston College Eagles women's basketball seasons
Boston College
Boston College Eagles women's basketball
Boston College Eagles women's basketball
Boston College Eagles women's basketball
Boston College Eagles women's basketball